Louis Plamondon  (born July 31, 1943) is a Canadian politician who has represented Bécancour—Nicolet—Saurel (formerly known as Bas-Richelieu—Nicolet—Bécancour and Richelieu) in the House of Commons since 1984, making him the Dean of the House, the longest-serving current member of the House of Commons.

Plamondon has won his seat in twelve consecutive federal elections, winning twice as a Progressive Conservative before becoming a founding member of the Bloc Québécois in 1990, after which he has been reelected ten more times. He, along with six other Bloc MPs, resigned from the Bloc's caucus to sit as an independent MP on February 28, 2018 citing conflicts with the leadership style of Martine Ouellet. He rejoined the Bloc Québécois caucus on September 17, 2018.

Early life and career
Plamondon was born in Saint-Raymond-de-Portneuf, Quebec and is the brother of lyricist Luc Plamondon. He has a teaching certificate from L'École normale Maurice L. Duplessis (1964), a Bachelor of Arts degree from Laval University (1968), and a B.A.An. from the University of Montreal (1976). He was a math teacher and restaurant owner before entering political life. Plamondon supported the "oui" side in Quebec's 1980 referendum on sovereignty.

Member of Parliament

Progressive Conservative MP
Plamondon was first elected to the Canadian House of Commons in the 1984 federal election, defeating Liberal Party incumbent Jean-Louis Leduc in Richelieu. The Progressive Conservatives won a landslide majority government in this election under Brian Mulroney's leadership, and Plamondon entered parliament as a government backbencher. He was associated with the Quebec nationalist wing of his party and soon became known as a maverick. In 1986, he criticized justice minister John Crosbie for appointing an anglophone to replace the sole francophone judge on the Ontario Court of Appeal. He later criticized industry minister Sinclair Stevens for awarding a multimillion-dollar untendered contract to a shipbuilding company in Quebec City. Plamondon also expressed sympathy with fellow MP Robert Toupin, who left the Progressive Conservatives in May 1986 to sit as an independent.

Plamondon was on the socially liberal wing of the Progressive Conservative Party. He voted against a motion to re-introduce capital punishment in 1987 and later opposed efforts to restrict abortion services. He strongly supported the Mulroney government's efforts to strengthen official bilingualism and criticized dissident anglophone Tory MPs who tried to weaken the government's reforms.

Plamondon was also one of the more pro-labour members of the Tory caucus. In 1985, he promoted a partnership between the federal and Quebec governments and the Quebec Federation of Labour's Solidarity Fund. Two years later, he stood with striking letter carriers in Sorel and criticized his own government's decision to approve replacement workers. He was prominent among a group of Quebec Tory MPs who tried to reduce the party's reliance on corporate donations. Ricardo López, a right-wing Quebec Tory MP, once suggested that Plamondon would be more suited to the social democratic New Democratic Party.

Plamondon was re-elected without difficulty in the 1988 federal election, as the Progressive Conservatives won a second majority government across the country. Over the following year, he became even more strongly aligned with the Quebec nationalist wing of his party. He supported Quebec premier Robert Bourassa's use of the Canadian constitution's notwithstanding clause to prohibit outdoor English-language signs, and expressed regret that the ban was not extended to indoor signs. He also criticized D'Iberville Fortier, Canada's official languages commissioner, for suggesting that Quebec was acting in an unjust manner toward its anglophone minority.

Consistent with his nationalist views, Plamondon was a vocal supporter of the Mulroney government's proposed Meech Lake Accord on constitutional reform and opposed Jean Charest's efforts to modify the accord in early 1990. During this period, Plamondon speculated that sovereignty-association between Quebec and Canada would be "logical and reasonable" if the accord failed and added that he might become a "Quebec-only MP" in that event. When the accord was rejected in June 1990, Plamondon resigned from the Progressive Conservative caucus and informed the House of Commons that he could no longer support a united Canada.

Bloc Québécois MP

Mulroney and Campbell Governments (1990–93)
Plamondon was one of a group of Progressive Conservative and Liberal MPs from Quebec who left their parties after the failure of the Meech Lake Accord. This group soon coalesced as the Bloc Québécois under the leadership of Lucien Bouchard. The Bloc was not initially given official recognition in the House of Commons, and its members were designated as independent MPs. Plamondon was recognized as the Bloc's house leader in 1992.

In its original form, the Bloc Québécois was a loose alliance of parliamentarians rather than a formal political party. Plamondon was one of the first Bloquistes to promote the creation of a strong party organization to challenge the Progressive Conservative Party's Quebec machine in the next federal election. Others, including Lucien Bouchard, initially favoured a weaker party structure that would simply allow Bloc candidates to have their party designation appear on the ballot. The vision favoured by Plamondon ultimately won out, and the Bloc became a strong political organization throughout Quebec.

Shortly after joining the BQ, Plamondon asked the federal government to apologize to the province of Quebec and provide financial compensation for those who were wrongly arrested under the War Measures Act in the 1970 FLQ Crisis. He later spoke against a bid by Izzy Asper to bring his Global Television Network to Montreal, arguing that the market was already saturated. In 1992, he described Mordechai Richler's book Oh Canada! Oh Quebec! as hate literature.

Plamondon was charged with attempting to hire a prostitute during an undercover sting operation in April 1993. He claimed innocence, saying that the charge was the result of a "bad joke between friends which lasted 45 seconds," but nonetheless resigned as his party's house leader pending resolution of the matter. He was renominated as the Bloc candidate for Richelieu despite the controversy.

Chrétien Government (1993–2003)
Plamondon was re-elected without difficulty in the 1993 federal election, as the Bloc won fifty-four out of seventy-five seats in Quebec to become the official opposition in the House of Commons. The Liberal Party won a majority government under the leadership of Jean Chrétien. At his own request, Plamondon was left out of the Bloc's initial shadow cabinet. He pleaded guilty to the charge against him in April 1994, maintaining his innocence but adding that he simply wanted to resolve the matter as quickly as possible. He received an absolute discharge and does not have a criminal record.

Plamondon co-chaired a funding and membership drive for the Bloc in early 1995. He opposed finance minister Paul Martin's austerity budget in the same year, arguing that it placed an unfair financial burden on the provinces to fight the federal deficit. He personally opposed the Chrétien government's gun registry legislation, which the Bloc supported, and he absented himself from the parliamentary vote that led to its passage.

After a narrow federalist victory in Quebec's 1995 referendum on sovereignty, Lucien Bouchard left the Bloc Québécois to become leader of its provincial counterpart, the Parti Québécois (PQ). Plamondon initially favoured Bernard Landry to become the Bloc's new leader, arguing that he was the best positioned of all candidates to unite the party's different factions. Landry decided not to run, and Gilles Duceppe eventually succeeded Bouchard as leader.

Plamondon supported the Chrétien government's choice of Dyane Adam to become Canada's official language commissioner in 1998, saying that she would be "tougher" than her predecessor Victor Goldbloom (whom he nonetheless acknowledged had done good work on education matters). He endorsed Adam's criticism of the Chrétien government in 2000, when she wrote that it was not sufficiently committed to defending official bilingualism. Plamondon strongly opposed the Clarity Act legislation introduced by intergovernmental affairs minister Stéphane Dion in 1999, arguing that it would create confusion in any future referendum on Quebec sovereignty.

Martin Government (2003–2006)
Paul Martin replaced Jean Chrétien as Liberal Party leader and prime minister in late 2003. Shortly before he was sworn in, Plamondon published a short book entitled Le mythe Paul Martin. As its title implies, the work was highly critical of its subject: Plamondon accused Martin of damaging Quebec's interests during his time in the Chrétien cabinet. He also argued that Martin would become an ally of United States president George W. Bush, neglect the low-income citizens of Canada and Quebec, and favour the interests of English Canada. The Bloc distributed one thousand free copies of the book, and a further fifteen hundred copies were put on sale in bookstores. Martin's supporters dismissed the work as a negative campaign ploy lacking any progressive vision, and Liberal MP Don Boudria asked the speaker of the House of Commons to investigate whether Plamondon had broken parliamentary rules by using publicly funded research staff to help compile the book.

It was initially believed that Paul Martin's Liberals would win a majority of seats in Quebec at the expense of the Bloc, but the Liberal Party's fortunes were instead damaged by the sponsorship scandal, in which some advertising revenues approved by the Chrétien government to promote Canadian federalism in Quebec were found to have been misused. The Bloc soon re-established itself as the dominant federal party in Quebec, and the Liberals were reduced to a minority government in the 2004 federal election. Plamondon was chosen as BQ caucus chair in the new parliament.

When Bernard Landry resigned as Parti Québécois leader in 2005, rumours circulated that Gilles Duceppe would run to succeed him. Plamondon said that most Bloc MPs wanted Duceppe to stay in federal politics but would respect his decision one way or the other. Duceppe chose to remain with the Bloc, and André Boisclair became PQ leader.

Harper Government (2006–2015)
Plamondon was elected to a seventh term in the 2006 federal election, as the Conservative Party won a minority government under the leadership of Stephen Harper. Widely respected as an electoral strategist, Plamondon later prepared an internal brief examining why the Bloc lost seats in the Quebec City area to the Conservatives. He remained as the Bloc's caucus chair.

André Boisclair resigned as Parti Québécois leader after a poor showing in the 2007 provincial election, and rumours again circulated that Duceppe would run to succeed him. This time, Plamondon told reporters that Duceppe should run for the provincial leadership to impose discipline on the notoriously unruly party. Some in the PQ objected to this comment, which galvanized resistance to a Duceppe candidacy. Duceppe eventually entered the leadership contest, but withdrew after only one day due to poor polling and a growing sense that the sovereigntist movement would be divided if he won. He stayed as leader of the Bloc, and Plamondon helped ensure his successful transition back to the federal scene.

When Brian Mulroney released his memoirs in September 2007, he alleged that Lucien Bouchard had conspired with Jacques Parizeau to create the Bloc Québécois while still a federal cabinet minister. Plamondon rejected this, arguing that Bouchard was loyal to Mulroney until resigning in protest against the government's handling of the Meech Lake Accord. Plamondon also criticized Jean Chrétien later in the year, when Chrétien wrote in his memoirs that he would not have recognized a narrow sovereigntist victory in the 1995 referendum.

Plamondon was re-elected to an eighth term in the 2008 election as the Conservatives won a second consecutive minority government. He was again chosen as BQ caucus chair and, as the longest-serving member of the House of Commons, was also recognized as Dean of the House. Plamondon presided over the Commons when it re-elected Peter Milliken as its speaker in October 2008 and acknowledged the irony that an MP from a sovereigntist party would hold this position.

Plamondon was returned by the narrowest margin of his career in the 2011 federal election following a strong challenge from the New Democratic Party (NDP). Gilles Duceppe was personally defeated in his riding and subsequently resigned as party leader; the Bloc won only four seats including Plamondon's and consequently lost official party status. Plamondon was chosen as the Bloc's acting house leader and, in the absence of a full-time leader, became its main parliamentary spokesperson. He remains Dean of the House and presided over the Commons when it chose Andrew Scheer to be Milliken's successor as speaker on June 2, 2011; the Harper-led Conservatives had won a majority government at the election.

Trudeau Government (2015–present)
Plamondon was the Bloc candidate in his riding for the 2015 Canadian federal election, and was the only Bloc MP elected in 2011 to be running under the party banner again. He was re-elected to a tenth term in the House of Commons, presiding over the House as it elected Geoff Regan as Speaker; the Liberals had won a majority government under the leadership of Justin Trudeau. He was reelected to an 11th term in October 2019, to retain his position as Dean of the House and preside over the election of Anthony Rota as Speaker.

Publications

Le mythe Paul Martin, 2003

Electoral record

References

External links

 Official site
 Parliamentary profile
 Party biography

1943 births
Bloc Québécois MPs
Canadian educators
Canadian political party founders
People from Saint-Raymond, Quebec
People from Sorel-Tracy
Living people
Members of the House of Commons of Canada from Quebec
Progressive Conservative Party of Canada MPs
Université Laval alumni
Université de Montréal alumni
Université du Québec à Trois-Rivières alumni
21st-century Canadian politicians
Québec debout MPs